Alex Legion (born November 16, 1988) is an American professional basketball player who last played for CD Valdivia of the Liga Nacional de Básquetbol de Chile before ending his career in 2019.

College career 
He signed out of high school with the University of Michigan, but withdrew his commitment when Wolverine head coach Tommy Amaker was fired. He then enrolled at the University of Kentucky but transferred to the University of Illinois during his first college semester. Legion enrolled for the second semester, making him eligible to play after the conclusion of the fall semester of 2008. He played his sophomore year and half of his junior year with the Illinois, but after averaging only 2.7 points in 10 minutes per game at the beginning of the 2009 season, he decided not to return to the team after winter break. Legion then transferred to Florida International University, to be coached by Isiah Thomas. In February 2011, Legion was dismissed from Florida International University for a violation of team rules.

College statistics

|-
| align="left" | 2007–08
| align="left" | Kentucky
| 6 || 2 || 17.5 || .417 || .333 || .556 || 1.8 || 1.3 || 1.5 || .2 || 6.7
|-
| align="left" | 2008–09
| align="left" | Illinois
| 22 || 0 || 11.1 || .289 || .240 || .750 || 1.5 || 0.5 || .4 || .0 || 3.5
|-
| align="left" | 2009–10
| align="left" | Illinois
| 11 || 1 || 9.9 || .297 || .211 || .667 || 0.9 || 0.5 || .3 || .1 || 2.7
|-
| align="left" | 2010–11
| align="left" | Florida International
| 10 || 2 || 28.1 || .462 || .431 || .636 || 5.1 || 1.3 || 1.0 || .4 || 13.0
|-
| align="left" | Career
| align="left" | 
| 49 || 5 || 15.1 || .373 || .323 || .657 || 2.1 || 0.8 || .6 || .1 || 5.7

Professional career
After one year workout he signed with PVSK Panthers of Hungary for the 2012–13 season.

In September 2013, he signed with Roseto Sharks of Italy for the 2013–14 season. In May 2014, he joined Sagesse Beirut of Lebanon for one game. In July 2014, he returned to Italy and signed with Veroli Basket. On December 4, 2014, he left Veroli and signed with Pallacanestro Trapani for the rest of the season.

On July 18, 2015, Legion signed with Al Jaysh Doha of the Qatari Basketball League. On January 26, 2016, he signed with Arkadikos of Greece for the rest of the 2015–16 Greek Basket League season.

On July 29, 2016, Legion signed with Viola Reggio Calabria of Italy for the 2016–17 season. On January 23, 2017, he left Reggio Calabria and signed with Fortitudo Bologna for the rest of the season. On June 20, 2017, he re-signed with Fortitudo for one more season. On February 1, 2018, he left Fortitudo and signed with Pallacanestro Mantovana for the rest of the 2017–18 season.

On November 25, 2018, Legion signed with CD Valdivia but his contract was not renewed.

In February 2021, Legion stepped down from his position as Parks and Recreation Director in his hometown of Inkster, Michigan amid allegations of theft and embezzlement. He was alleged to have pocketed a $1,500 payment from the Joe Biden presidential campaign to rent a city facility the day before the November election. The Biden administration wrote a $1,500 check to Signature Milestones LLC to rent the facility; Legion was an organizer and managing partner with the company, according to state corporate records in 2017 and 2019. City officials first became suspicious of Legion when they noticed he was leasing the facility to friends and using the rental funds to renovate his city office, according to Inkster Mayor Patrick Wimberly.

References

External links
Eurobasket.com profile
RealGM.com profile
Illinois Bio
FIU Bio

1988 births
Living people
American expatriate basketball people in Chile
American expatriate basketball people in Greece
American expatriate basketball people in Hungary
American expatriate basketball people in Italy
American expatriate basketball people in Lebanon
American expatriate basketball people in Qatar
American men's basketball players
Arkadikos B.C. players
Basketball players from Detroit
Fortitudo Pallacanestro Bologna players
Illinois Fighting Illini men's basketball players
Jordanian men's basketball players
Kentucky Wildcats men's basketball players
Pallacanestro Trapani players
Parade High School All-Americans (boys' basketball)
PVSK Panthers players
Roseto Sharks players
Small forwards
Veroli Basket players
Viola Reggio Calabria players
Oak Hill Academy (Mouth of Wilson, Virginia) alumni
Sagesse SC basketball players